Homa Shaibany (born in Tehran, Iran circa 1913), was Iran's first female surgeon.

In 1930, she received a scholarship to study medicine at London University and received a bachelor's degree in anatomy and morphology. She received her M.B.B.S. in 1939. She was licensed by the Royal College of Physicians. She worked in England until 1948, when she returned to Iran.  She established a hospital for the Red Cross.

References

External links
Homa Shaibany, M.B.B.S.; first woman surgeon of Iran

Iranian surgeons
Women surgeons
Year of death missing
Iranian women physicians
20th-century Iranian physicians
20th-century women physicians
Year of birth uncertain
20th-century surgeons